Christian Manrique may refer to:

 Christian Manrique (engineer), Spanish civil engineer
 Christian Manrique (footballer), Spanish footballer